The Bradford Burns Unit is a burns research facility set up at University of Bradford following the Bradford fire disaster on 11 May 1985. The fire disaster at Valley Parade killed 56 people and injured more than 250.

Founder 

Professor David Sharpe founded the Bradford Burns Unit after he received many of the burns victims from the Bradford Fire Disaster in 1985.

Born from the Bradford Fire Disaster 

On 11 May 1985, just before half time of the old Division 3 fixture between Bradford City Football Club and Lincoln City Football Club, in the last game of the 1984/85 season, a fire broke out in the G block of the main stand at Valley Parade.

The fire quickly spread and within minutes the whole of the wooden main stand was engulfed, resulting in the death of 56 people and injury of over 250.

After a full inquest, it was revealed that the cause of the fire was a disregarded cigarette which had been dropped where there was a build up of litter. This caught fire and with the assistance of wind and a wooden stand. Caused the fire to quickly spread.

The horrific injuries that a young David Sharpe had to treat along with other staff lead to him setting up the Bradford Burns Unit at Bradford University to research ways into treating burns injuries.

Fundraising

Bantams Trek 
As a result of the need for ongoing funding for the Burns Unit, In late 2010 Bantams Trek was set up to raise money for it by Bradford City assistant kit manager Graham Duckworth.

It was given its name as the majority of events would involve walking. It was set up by Bradford City assistant kit manager Graham Duckworth whose first walk was from Bradford City's home ground Valley Parade to Lincoln City's home ground at Sincil Bank, a 73 miles walk completed in under 24 hours which was completed on 1 January 2011. It raised £6660 for the Bradford Burns Unit and a presentation was made at half time of the corresponding fixture between Bradford City and Lincoln City at Valley Parade on 2 February 2011.

On 18 June 2011 Peter Jackson & Lee Bullock took part in the Bantams Trek 3 Peaks Challenge to raise money for the Bradford Burns Unit along with 45 other Bradford City supporters.

Burns Unit Appeal 
Bradford Newspaper Telegraph & Argus set up an appeal to save the Bradford Burns Unit in 2009 after it was reported that the Bradford Burns Unit needed £100,000 to keep doing their research work.

References

External links
 Bantams Trek - Walking for Bradford Burns Unit
 Bradford City Football Club
 Telegraph & Argus
 

Medical research institutes in the United Kingdom